This is a list of official recordings by The Monkees.

Albums

Studio albums 

 Changes initially failed to chart upon release in 1970, but made the Billboard 200 when reissued in 1986.
 Justus was released initially only on cassette and CD, but not on vinyl. It was issued on limited edition vinyl on October 30, 2012.

Live albums

Compilation albums

EPs

Colgems Records did not release extended-play records for the mass market, but this list includes the two "little LP" versions of the Monkees' first two albums for use in jukeboxes. Internationally, RCA issued many EPs. This list includes those released in Japan, Australia, New Zealand, and Mexico during the Colgems era, where they were most popular. This list also includes EPs released in the UK in the 1980s, some of which charted; American 3-inch CDs released by Arista Records; and EPs issued by Rhino Records expanding on their final two albums.

EPs are listed by their title in italics. Untitled EPs are listed by their leading track without italics.

Singles

The following table includes all major singles released in the United States, including the 12 issued by Colgems Records from 1966–70; the 1971 Bell single "Do It in the Name of Love"; two Dolenz, Jones, Boyce & Hart singles released on Columbia Records; the Christmas singles released in 1976 and 2018; the two charting Arista singles released in conjunction with the 1986 compilation album Then & Now... The Best of The Monkees; both Rhino singles released in conjunction with the 1987 album Pool It!; and the three digital singles issued in conjunction with Good Times! in 2016. While none of the tracks from the 1967 album Headquarters were issued as singles in North America, "Randy Scouse Git" was widely released elsewhere (often under the title 'Alternate Title'). RCA issued a large number of other singles internationally that were not released in the United States. This table only includes some noteworthy charting singles released in Europe, Japan, and Australia. A number of EPs charting as singles, non-charting reissues, withdrawn singles, cereal box records, archival recordings, and single-like novelties are not included.

Notes
A: Released in Japan as The Monkees, and as Mickey Dolenz & Davy Jones elsewhere. The Japanese single failed to chart in 1971, but a 1981 reissue reached #93.

B: Released as Dolenz, Jones, Boyce & Hart.
C: Released in 1976 as Micky Dolenz, Davy Jones and Peter Tork. A remixed reissue was released in 1986 as We Three Monkees.

D: Initially released as The Monkees, but subsequently released as Micky Dolenz & Peter Tork of The Monkees due to a trademark dispute.
E: Digital-only single.

References

External links
 

Discographies of American artists
Film and television discographies
Rock music group discographies
Pop music group discographies